David Higgins may refer to:
 David Higgins (composer) (1938–2006), composer and choral conductor
 David Higgins (golfer) (born 1972), Irish professional golfer
 David Higgins (archer) (born 1968), Australian Paralympic archer
 David Higgins (astronomer) (born 1961), Australian amateur astronomer
 David Anthony Higgins (born 1961), American comedic actor
 David Higgins (businessman) (born 1954), chairman of United Utilities
 David Higgins (merchant) (died 1783), ship's captain, merchant, early settler and political figure on St John's Island (later Prince Edward Island)
 David Higgins (rally driver) (born 1972), British rally driver
 David Higgins (rower) (born 1947), American Olympic rower
 David Higgins (sport shooter) (born 1994), American sport shooter
 David Williams Higgins (1834–1917), Canadian journalist, politician, and author
 David Higgins (Ohio politician) (1789–1873), politician and judge from the U.S. State of Ohio
 David Higgins (event promoter) (born 1979), Boxing Promoter from New Zealand
 David Higgins (Mississippi politician) ( 1823 – ?), Mississippi politician